A referendum on remaining in Yugoslavia was held in the parts of Bosnia and Herzegovina with a significant Serb population on 10 November 1991. The referendum was organised by the Bosnian Serb Assembly and asked two questions; to Serbs it asked:

Non-Serbs were asked:

It was approved by 98% of voters, and Republika Srpska was subsequently established on 9 January 1992.

Results

Aftermath
The Bosnian government declared the referendum unconstitutional. It later held a nationwide independence referendum between 29 February and 1 March 1992, which was in turn boycotted by most of the Serbs. Steven L. Burg and Paul S. Shoup interpreted the question in the plebiscite, which asked voters to stay in a "common state with Serbia, Montenegro, the SAO Krajina, SAO Slavonija, Baranja and Western Srem, and Serb Autonomous Regions" as promoting, in effect, a Greater Serbia.

References

Books

Other

Bosnian Serbs
1991 in Bosnia and Herzegovina
1991 in Yugoslavia
Referendums in Bosnia and Herzegovina
Referendums in Yugoslavia
Referendums in Republika Srpska
History of Republika Srpska
History of the Serbs of Bosnia and Herzegovina
Political history of Republika Srpska
Serbian nationalism in Bosnia and Herzegovina